Germán Sánchez Barahona (born 12 December 1986), known simply as Germán, is a Spanish professional footballer who plays as a central defender for Racing de Santander.

Club career

Early years
Born in San Fernando, Cádiz, Andalusia, Germán started playing with UD San Fernando as a central midfielder, and made his senior debut with GE Bazán CF the following season. He first arrived in Segunda División B in 2008 with CD San Fernando, on loan from Cádiz CF.

Germán returned to the Estadio Ramón de Carranza in the summer of 2007, initially being assigned to the reserves in Tercera División but moving to the first team in June 2010. After making no league appearances during the first half of the 2010–11 campaign, he moved to San Fernando CD on 31 January 2011. Always a starter, he helped the latter club win promotion to the third level in 2012, being converted to a central defender in the process. 

On 19 June 2014, after suffering relegation, Germán signed a one-year deal with UE Olot. On 27 May 2015, he opted to not renew his contract at the division three side.

Tenerife
Germán joined CD Tenerife on 10 July 2015, after agreeing to a one-year contract. He made his Segunda División debut on 23 August at the age of 28, starting in a 6–3 away loss against CD Numancia.

Germán scored his first professional goal on 25 October 2015, a last-minute equaliser in a 2–2 home draw with CA Osasuna.

Granada
On 3 July 2017, Germán signed a two-year deal with Granada CF also of the second tier. In 2018–19, he contributed 38 matches and one goal as they returned to La Liga after a two-year absence, and subsequently agreed to an extension until 30 June 2021.

Germán's maiden appearance in the competition took place on 17 August 2019, when he played the entire 4–4 draw at Villarreal CF. He scored his first goal on 15 September, opening a 2–0 away win over RC Celta de Vigo seconds before half-time.

Germán played 13 games in the 2020–21 edition of the UEFA Europa League, and his side reached the quarter-finals in their first-ever participation in Europe.

Racing Santander
On 4 August 2022, free agent Germán joined Racing de Santander on a two-year contract.

Personal life
Sánchez's brother, Servando, was also a footballer and a defender.

Career statistics

Club

References

External links

Stats and bio at Cadistas1910 

1986 births
Living people
People from San Fernando, Cádiz
Sportspeople from the Province of Cádiz
Spanish footballers
Footballers from Andalusia
Association football defenders
La Liga players
Segunda División players
Segunda División B players
Tercera División players
Divisiones Regionales de Fútbol players
CD San Fernando players
Cádiz CF B players
Cádiz CF players
San Fernando CD players
UE Olot players
CD Tenerife players
Granada CF footballers
Racing de Santander players